Lennox G. Burgher (born 17 March 1946) is a Jamaican athlete. He competed in the men's triple jump at the 1968 Summer Olympics.

References

1946 births
Living people
Athletes (track and field) at the 1966 British Empire and Commonwealth Games
Athletes (track and field) at the 1968 Summer Olympics
Athletes (track and field) at the 1970 British Commonwealth Games
Jamaican male triple jumpers
Olympic athletes of Jamaica
Place of birth missing (living people)
Commonwealth Games competitors for Jamaica